The Moswansicut River is a river in the U.S. state of Rhode Island. There are two dams along the river's length.

Course
The river's source is Kimball Reservoir, located near Sickkibunkiaut Hill in Johnston, where water from the lake still flows naturally into the river, unimpeded by a dam. From there, the river flows to Moswansicut Pond, then on to the Scituate Reservoir. The river used to converge with the Ponaganset River to form the North Branch Pawtuxet River in the area that is now flooded by the Scituate Reservoir.

Crossings
Below is a list all crossings over the Moswansicut River. The list starts at the headwaters and goes downstream.
Scituate
Hopkins Avenue
West Greenville Road (RI 116)

Tributaries
Huntinghouse and Peeptoad brooks are the only named tributaries of the Moswansicut River, though it has many unnamed streams that also feed it.

See also
List of rivers in Rhode Island

References
Maps from the United States Geological Survey

Rivers of Providence County, Rhode Island
Rivers of Rhode Island
Tributaries of Providence River